The 1982 Eastern Michigan Hurons football team represented Eastern Michigan University in the 1982 NCAA Division I-A football season. The Hurons compiled a 1–9–1 record (1–7–1 against conference opponents), finished in ninth place in the Mid-American Conference, and were outscored by their opponents, 205 to 85. Mike Stock was the head coach for the first three games, compiling a 0–3 record, part of a 27-game losing streak dating back to the 1980 season.  Bob LaPointe was the head coach for the final eight games, compiling a 1–6–1 record. Stock had been the head coach since 1978. The team's statistical leaders included Steve Coulter with 1,290 passing yards, Ricky Calhoun with 656 rushing yards, and Rick Simpson with 385 receiving yards.

Schedule

References

Eastern Michigan
Eastern Michigan Eagles football seasons
Eastern Michigan Hurons football